Arthur 2: On the Rocks is a 1988 American romantic comedy film and the sequel to the 1981 film Arthur. Lead actors Dudley Moore and Liza Minnelli reprised their roles. John Gielgud, who won an Academy Award for his role in the original film, reappears briefly in a vision to Arthur during a drunken stupor. The film costars Kathy Bates as a woman who helps Arthur and Linda adopt a baby. Almost the entire cast from the first film reprised their roles, except for Jill Eikenberry, who was busy filming L.A. Law at the time. Because of this, the character of Susan was played by Cynthia Sikes instead.

Burt Bacharach also returned to score the film. The soundtrack also features songs by popular artists, including OMD and Kylie Minogue. While still a comedy, On the Rocks is notably darker than its predecessor. The film received generally negative reviews and also was a financial disappointment when compared to the more successful original.

Plot 

Roughly five years after the events of the first film, Arthur Bach (Dudley Moore) is married to Linda (Liza Minnelli). Arthur's new assistant is a friendly but uptight man named Fairchild (Paul Benedict), and while Arthur enjoys playing practical jokes on Fairchild, he still deeply misses Hobson. Arthur and Linda have a happy marriage, but it is not without its problems. Arthur is still an alcoholic, and Linda is told by a doctor that she cannot have children. The two decide to adopt a child instead from a woman named Mrs. Canby (Kathy Bates), but Arthur's drinking is a cause for concern.

Shortly after this, Arthur is informed by his father that the family's company has undergone a business merger with Burt Johnson (Stephen Elliott), the vengeful billionaire father of Susan Johnson (Cynthia Sikes), Arthur's ex-fiancee. The Bach family will get to keep their wealth and way of life, but only if Arthur is cut off from his $750,000,000 fortune. Arthur confronts Burt about this, and Burt tells him that he can have his money back on one condition: divorce Linda and marry Susan. Arthur refuses, as he loves Linda more than his lavish lifestyle.

Now broke, Arthur and Linda move in with Linda's father, Ralph (Barney Martin) and Linda gets back her old job as a waitress. Things are going well at first, but Burt is determined to make Susan happy, so he buys the building they are living in and forces Arthur and Linda to leave. Now homeless, Arthur and Linda move into a squalid apartment and Arthur tries to sober up to find a job, knowing that bad finances could ruin any chance they have of adopting a baby. After the owner takes pity on him, Arthur finds work at a hardware store, but Burt buys the store and has Arthur fired.

Susan arrives at Arthur and Linda's apartment and tells Linda that if she really wants what's best for Arthur, then she should leave him. Susan also tells Linda that she can have children, and Linda cannot. Realizing that Arthur is suffering because he is unwilling to let her go, a devastated Linda moves back in with her father and leaves Arthur a note telling him that he should marry Susan and live a comfortable life. Crestfallen at having lost Linda and still unwilling to marry Susan, Arthur begins drinking again and ends up living on the streets. At his lowest point, Arthur sees a vision of Hobson (John Gielgud) and Hobson tells him that he cannot give up, because he knows Arthur will have a son, and Arthur must be there for him.

Determined to get even with the Johnsons, Arthur gets sober again and learns from his grandmother, Martha (Geraldine Fitzgerald), that Burt has made a lot of enemies that have dirt on him. Arthur meets with several people whose lives have been ruined by Burt Johnson, and learns of a fraud and extortion scheme that Burt was responsible for. Arthur sneaks onto Burt's yacht and confronts him, demanding that they leave him and Linda alone. Burt and his friends laugh at Arthur, freely admitting that the allegations are true, but the statute of limitations has expired and the evidence is worthless. Arthur punches Burt in the gut, and Burt attempts to kill Arthur with a revolver. However, realizing that money cannot get her everything, Susan defends Arthur for the first time and tells her father to give Arthur his money back or she will tell her mother about his affairs. Burt reluctantly agrees, and Arthur thanks Susan before leaving to get his life back in order.

Arthur seeks out Linda and tells her that he has not only gotten his money back but also secured the adoption of a child. Linda and Arthur reunite and Mrs. Canby arrives with their adopted child, a baby girl. Arthur is confused because Hobson had told him he would have a son. However, Linda surprises Arthur with the news that she is pregnant, after all. The two return to their home and Fairchild plays a practical joke on Arthur for the first time. Arthur tells Fairchild to pack his things, and Fairchild, assuming he has been fired, does so. However, Arthur tells him that he is not fired, only moving rooms. He shows him to his new room, the room that used to belong to Hobson.

Cast

Production 
In 1987, Warner Bros. and Orion Pictures, the studio who made the original Arthur, made a tradeoff agreement whereas to facilitate the filming of Throw Momma from the Train, supplied by Orion Pictures, and the development of the movie, and the deal was provided by producer Larry Brezner, who produced Throw Momma from the Train as well as the original Arthur, and in return to use permission from Strangers on a Train, a 1951 Warner Bros. film for use with Throw Momma from the Train, Brezner's production company surrendered the remake and sequel rights of the 1981 film Arthur to Warner Bros., which the original Arthur rights were jointly owned by Rollins, Joffe, Morra and Brezner and Warner Bros., and the Warners could not have proceeded with the Arthur sequel without the consent of Brezner's company.

Reception 
The film received generally negative reviews from critics and holds a Rotten Tomatoes rating of  based on  reviews. The site's critical consensus reads, "Arthurs boozy charm curdles into a bad hangover in this unnecessary sequel." The Washington Post opined that "the result is about as funny as the plight of an alcoholic." Variety gave the film a positive review, saying On the Rocks is "Not as classy a farce as the original, but still manages to be an amusing romp for most of its length."

Liza Minnelli earned the 1988 Golden Raspberry Award for "Worst Actress" of the year, by performing in the film as well as Rent-a-Cop.

Box office 
The film was not a box office success, and was overshadowed by the release of Who Framed Roger Rabbit. It earned $14.7 million in American ticket sales, compared to the original film's $95.5 million.

References

External links 

 
 
 

1988 films
1988 romantic comedy films
American romantic comedy films
1980s English-language films
Films about alcoholism
Films set in New York City
American sequel films
Films directed by Bud Yorkin
Warner Bros. films
Golden Raspberry Award winning films
American Christmas comedy films
Arthur (film series)
Films with screenplays by Andy Breckman
Films scored by Burt Bacharach
1980s Christmas comedy films
1980s American films